Mark John Peter Jabalé, OSB (born 16 October 1933), is emeritus Bishop of Menevia. He was installed as bishop on 12 June 2001.

Life
Jabalé was born in Alexandria, Egypt and was a pupil at Belmont Abbey School. Upon finishing Sixth Form he immediately became a monk at the Abbey, and later studied French at university in Switzerland. He continued as a monk at Belmont and began teaching and coaching sport at his old school. He became Headmaster in 1969 and left that role in 1983. 

While teaching at Belmont Abbey School, he began coaching rowing, eventually coaching a GB crew to the 1979 World Rowing Championships where his Lightweight Men's Coxless Four won a gold medal. In the late 1970s he also coached the Oxford University crew in the early stages of a winning streak from 1976 to 1985. In 1985, while actually in Peru himself, he was elected a Steward of Henley Royal Regatta. He remains a Steward, and in 1986 was the first Roman Catholic to preach at St. Mary's, Henley, at the Regatta Service. In 2018 he was the preacher at a service commemorating 200 years of Leander Club.

He became Abbot of Belmont in 1993, and then coadjutor bishop of Menevia from 7 November 2000. Pope Benedict XVI accepted his resignation as Bishop of Menevia on 16 October 2008, Jabalé having reached the upper age limit of seventy five. He was succeeded by Bishop Tom Burns, formerly Bishop to the Forces.

On 13 March 2009, Bishop Jabalé was inducted as parish priest of Holy Trinity Catholic Church in Chipping Norton, by the Archbishop of Birmingham, Vincent Nichols. In August 2020 he retired from parochial life and returned to reside at the Belmont Abbey.

See also
Catholic Church in England and Wales
Catholic Church
Diocese of Menevia
Bishop of Menevia

References

External links

Catholic Hierarchy Biodata

1933 births
Living people
People from Alexandria
Roman Catholic bishops of Menevia
21st-century Roman Catholic bishops in Wales
Stewards of Henley Royal Regatta
Welsh Benedictines
Benedictine bishops
Egyptian bishops